The  Green Bay Packers season was their 50th season overall and the 48th season in the National Football League. Under first-year head coach Phil Bengtson, the team finished with a 6–7–1 record, third place in the four-team Central Division of the Western Conference.

It was the Packers' first losing season in a decade, and marked a turning point in team history, starting a long period of futility and decline known as the "Gory Years". From 1968 through 1991, Green Bay had only five winning seasons (1969, 1972, 1978, 1982, 1989), made the playoffs twice (1972, 1982), with one win (1982).

A few weeks after winning Super Bowl II in January 1968, Vince Lombardi stepped down as head coach but remained as general manager, and longtime defensive coordinator Bengston was promoted. Lombardi left after the season for the Washington Redskins.

Offseason

NFL draft

Roster

Schedule

Note: Intra-division opponents are in bold text.

Season summary

Week 1 vs Eagles

Week 14
A win by the Packers was important because a Bears loss means that The Minnesota Vikings clinched the Central Division title and their first ever playoff berth.

Standings

References

External links
 SportsEncyclopedia.com

Green Bay Packers seasons
Green Bay Packers
Green